Cold Chisel are an Australian pub rock band. The band have released nine studio albums. The band were included into the ARIA Hall of Fame in 1993.

Albums

Studio albums

Live albums

Compilation albums

EPs

Singles

1 "Khe Sanh" originally peaked at number 41 in 1978. It re-entered the Australian Singles Chart at a new peak of number 40 in August 2011.

Video albums

References

External links
 

Discography
Discographies of Australian artists
Rock music group discographies